AFPC may refer to:

 American Foreign Policy Council, a non-profit organization dedicated to bringing information to those who make or influence the foreign policy of the United States
 Australian Fair Pay Commission, an Australian legislative body created under the Howard Government's "WorkChoices" industrial relations law in 2006
 Air Force Personnel Center
 Away From PC